Oscar Stoumon (also spelled Stoumont) (20 August 1835 – 20 August 1900) was a Belgian composer, music critic, playwright and theatre director.

Stoumon was born in Liège.  He composed music for ballets, taught at the Conservatoire royal de Bruxelles and co-headed the Théâtre de la Monnaie with Calabresi (1875–85 and 1889–1900).  He died in Brussels.

Works
 Phœbé, one-act opéra-comique (Brussels, Théâtre royal de la Monnaie, 19 January 1860)
 Endymion, one-act ballet (Brussels, Monnaie, 21 April 1861)
 La Ferme, one-act opéra-comique (Liège, 10 April 1862)
 L'Orco, two-act and three-scene opéra fantastique (Brussels, Monnaie, 8 January 1864)
 La Reine des prairies, two-act ballet (Brussels, Monnaie, 24 November 1865)
 La Fée amoureuse, two-act ballet (Brussels, Monnaie, 5 December 1867)
 Les Fumeurs d'opium, one-act operetta (Brussels, Théâtre royal des Galeries, 9 January 1869)
 Les Belles de nuit, one-act ballet (Brussels, Monnaie, 16 March 1870)
 La Sonate pathétique, one-act comedy (Brussels, Monnaie, 7 November 1870)
 Un fil à la patte, one-act comedy (Brussels, Galeries, 11 April 1871)
 Les Hannetons, one-act opéra-bouffe (Brussels, Galeries, 22 April 1871)
 Une grève, three-act comedy (Brussels, Galeries, 30 September 1871)
 Une nuit d'hiver, one-act comedy (Brussels, Galeries, 23 March 1872)
 L'Échéance, three-act comedy (Brussels, Galeries, 25 January 1873)
 Les Enfarinés, one-act comedy (Brussels, Galeries, 17 January 1874)
 La Moisson, one-act ballet (Brussels, Monnaie, 29 January 1875)
 La Nuit de Noël, one-act ballet (Brussels, Monnaie, 14 October 1880)
 Les Sorrentines, one-act ballet (Brussels, Monnaie, 11 October 1882)
 La Tzigane, one-act ballet (Brussels, Monnaie, 27 March 1885)
 Farfalla, one-act ballet (Brussels, Monnaie, 14 November 1893)

References

External links
 

1835 births
1900 deaths
Musicians from Liège
Belgian music critics
Directors of La Monnaie
Belgian composers
Male composers
Belgian male musicians
Ballet composers
Opera managers
19th-century journalists
Male journalists
19th-century composers
19th-century male writers
19th-century Belgian male musicians